Bilah Daraq (also Romanized as Bīlah Daraq; also known as Vīlā Darreh and Valī Darreh) is a village in the Central District of Sareyn County, Ardabil Province, Iran. At the 2006 census, its population was 492 in 105 families.

References 

Tageo

Towns and villages in Sareyn County